Mwanza Muteba (born 29 September 1980) is a Congolese former football player.

Career
In 2001, Muteba became the first Congolese footballer to play in the Russian top flight, when he signed for Anzhi Makhachkala, but only made one appearance for the club.

Career statistics

References

External links
 

1980 births
Living people
Republic of the Congo footballers
Republic of the Congo expatriate footballers
Republic of the Congo expatriate sportspeople in Russia
Expatriate footballers in Russia
Republic of the Congo expatriate sportspeople in Belarus
Expatriate footballers in Belarus
Republic of the Congo expatriate sportspeople in Azerbaijan
Expatriate footballers in Azerbaijan
Republic of the Congo expatriate sportspeople in Northern Cyprus
Expatriate footballers in Northern Cyprus
AS Vita Club players
Russian Premier League players
FC Anzhi Makhachkala players
FC Torpedo Mogilev players
FK MKT Araz players
AZAL PFK players
Association football midfielders